Otto Nieminen (born 8 May 1996) is a Finnish ice hockey player. He is currently a free agent.

Nieminen made his Liiga debut playing with HC TPS during the 2014–15 season.

Career statistics

Regular season and playoffs

References

External links

1996 births
Living people
Finnish ice hockey right wingers
HC TPS players
Ice hockey players at the 2012 Winter Youth Olympics
Youth Olympic gold medalists for Finland
HK Spišská Nová Ves players
People from Somero
Sportspeople from Southwest Finland
Finnish expatriate ice hockey players in Denmark
Finnish expatriate ice hockey players in Slovakia